Capitalia was an Italian banking group headquartered in Rome. The bank was a listed company in Borsa Italiana (Milan Stock Exchange). The bank was acquired by UniCredit by issuing new shares of UniCredit for shares of Capitalia.

History
Capitalia was formed on 1 July 2002 in a merger of Banca di Roma (and its subsidiary Banco di Sicilia and Mediocredito Centrale) and Bipop Carire (and its subsidiary Fineco). In the same year the bank sold 10 branches from Apulia, Campania and Molise regions to Banca Popolare di Puglia e Basilicata.

Capitalia in turn agreed to be taken over by UniCredit in May 2007, becoming part of the second-largest bank in the European Union by stock market value and the sixth-largest in the world.

Merger with UniCredit
In May 2007, plans were finalized for the buyout of Capitalia by its larger Italian rival, UniCredit. All banks of the Capitalia group in Northern Italy will be reconfigured as UniCredit banks; in turn, all Unicredit banks in the rest of Italy will be reconfigured as either Banca di Roma banks (rest of mainland Italy and Sardinia) or as Banco di Sicilia banks (in Sicily only).

Group members

 retail banks:
 Banca di Roma
 Banco di Sicilia
 Bipop Carire
 FinecoBank (99.99% stake)
 Commercial, investment and merchant banks:
 Capitalia Merchant S.p.A.
 Capitalia Partecipazioni S.p.A.
 Capitalia Sofipa SGR S.p.A. (ex-MCC Sofipa SGR)
 Capitalia Asset Management SGR S.p.A.
 Capitalia Investimenti Alternativi SGR S.p.A. (95% stake, other 5% FinecoBank)
 Capitalia Luxembourg S.A. (99.99% stake, ex-Banca di Roma International)
 Eurofinance 2000
 FinecoLeasing S.p.A. (99.99% stake)
 Fineco Finance Limited
 Fineco Mutui S.p.A. (subsidiary of FinecoBank)
 Fineco Verwaltung
 Fondi Immobiliari Italiani SGR (51.55% stake)
 IRFIS – Mediocredito della Sicilia (subsidiary of Banco di Sicilia for 76.25% stake)
 Immobiliari Piemonte (subsidiary of MCC)
 Mediocredito Centrale
 common service companies:
 Capitalia Informatica S.p.A.
 Capitalia Service JV S.r.l.
 Capitalia Solutions (51% stake)

 minority interests
 Fineco Assicurazioni S.p.A. (49% stake)
 CNP Capitalia Vita S.p.A. (16.92% stake by Capitalia, 21.88% stake by Fineco Verwaltung)
 Italpetroli (49% stake via Banca di Roma)
 Roma 2000 (via Italpetroli)
 A.S. Roma (via Roma 2000)

Shareholders

shareholders with >2% stake
 ABN AMRO Group (8.59%)
 Fondazione Cassa di Risparmio di Roma (5.02%)
 Fondazione Manodori (4.13%)
 Fondiaria-Sai Group (3.51%)
 Sicily Region (2.84%)
 Fondazione Banco di Sicilia (2.73%)
 Libyan Foreign Bank (2.58%)
 Assicurazioni Generali (2.35%)
 Tosinvest (2.10%)

References

External links

 

Defunct banks of Italy
Italian companies established in 2002
Banks established in 2002
Italian companies disestablished in 2007
Banks disestablished in 2007
UniCredit Group
Capitalia Group